35 Aquarii is a single star located roughly 2,200 light years away from the Sun in the zodiac constellation of Aquarius. 35 Aquarii is its Flamsteed designation. It is visible to the naked eye as a dim, blue-white hued star with an apparent visual magnitude of 5.80. This object is moving closer to the Earth with a heliocentric radial velocity of −7 km/s, and is a suspected runaway star that may have been ejected from an open cluster as the result of a binary–binary interaction.

This is a blue giant star with a stellar classification of B2 III;, a massive star that has evolved off the main sequence. It is around 22.5 million years old with a relatively low projected rotational velocity of 10 km/s. The star has 10 times the mass of the Sun and is radiating 1,622 times the Sun's luminosity from its photosphere at an effective temperature of 17,400 K.

References

B-type giants
Runaway stars
Aquarius (constellation)
Durchmusterung objects
Aquarii, 035
210191
109332
8439